The Great Central Railway Class 11F or Improved Director Class is a class of 4-4-0 steam locomotive designed by John G. Robinson for passenger work.  The LNER classified them as Class D11 from 1923.  They were based on the earlier GCR Class 11E "Director" class (LNER D10).

There were two subclasses: D11/1 were the original GCR engines and D11/2 were those built in 1924 by the LNER to a reduced loading gauge with smaller boiler mountings for hauling passenger trains in Scotland.

Operational career

The 11F Class was initially used on passenger work on the GCR system, including fast expresses from Sheffield Victoria to London Marylebone. Later in their careers, they were used on short-distance passenger trains. On lines of the Cheshire Lines Committee during the late 1940s and early 1950s, they hauled expresses between Manchester Central and Liverpool Central; also semi-fast trains from Manchester Central via Northwich to Chester Northgate.

Their 6 ft 9 inches driving wheels made them fast locos, but consequently unsuitable for hauling freight trains. The eleven original 11F locos were withdrawn during 1959 and 1960 as diesel multiple units took over operation of the shorter distance passenger trains.

Preservation 

The sixth member of the  class, No. 506 Butler-Henderson, was withdrawn from use by British Railways during 1960. It has been preserved as part of the UK National Collection and currently wears restored GCR colours. No. 506 is the only surviving GCR passenger locomotive.

The locomotive operated passenger trains on the preserved Great Central Railway in Leicestershire during the late 1970s, 1980s and early 1990s but is now out of running order. The locomotive was placed on long-term loan for static display at Barrow Hill Engine Shed, near Chesterfield, in 2005, where she currently resides.

Stock list

Models 
Bachmann Branchline produce model of the D11 in other Great Central liveries, LNER liveries and British Railway liveries, including a NRM exclusive model of 'Butler Henderson'.

References

External links 

 LNER encyclopedia
 Railuk database D11/1
 Railuk database D11/2
 Great Central Railway page on 506

11F
4-4-0 locomotives
2′B h2 locomotives
Armstrong Whitworth locomotives
Kitson locomotives
Railway locomotives introduced in 1919
Standard gauge steam locomotives of Great Britain
Passenger locomotives